The Trondëk Hwëchin (formerly the Dawson Indian Band) is a First Nation band government located in the Canadian territory, Yukon. Its main population centre is Dawson City, Yukon.

Many of today's Trondëk Hwëchin, or people of the river, are descendants of the Hän-speaking people who have lived along the Yukon River for thousands of years. They traveled extensively throughout their traditional territory harvesting salmon from the Yukon River and caribou from the Fortymile and Porcupine Herds. Moose, small game, and a variety of plants and berries provided additional food sources. Other raw materials needed to make tools, clothing and shelter were procured from this diverse and rich environment. The Hän traded with neighboring First Nations people and maintained interrelations through family connections and frequent gatherings.

In the mid-19th century, European fur traders and missionaries established a presence in the territory. Contact with the newcomers presented new challenges and opportunities for the Hän. Trade increased and new goods and economic practices were introduced. The Hän used a combination of traditional and newly introduced skills, goods and materials to maintain their survival and assist the newcomers.

In the 1880s gold was discovered in the Chëdäh Dëk, or Fortymile River, area – a site used by the Hän as a caribou interception point and grayling fishing spot. In 1896 more gold was discovered near Tr'ochëk, at the confluence of the Yukon and Klondike Rivers. The Klondike River hosted abundant salmon stocks and the Hän had an encampment at Tr'ochëk that was used seasonally for hundreds of years. The ensuing rush brought thousands of people to Tr'ochëk and surrounding areas.

Chief Isaac was respected among his own people and newcomers alike. While he welcomed the stampeders, "he never failed to remind them that they prospered at the expense of the original inhabitants by driving away their game and taking over their land." Chief Isaac envisioned the impact that new lifestyles would have on Hän traditional culture. In response he entrusted many songs and dances to First Nations people living in Alaska.

During the years following the Klondike Gold Rush, the Hän worked to find a balance between their traditional lifestyle and the ways of the newcomers.

Yukon First Nations set the Land Claims process in motion during the 1970s. Trondëk Hwëchin began negotiating their individual Land Claim in 1991. The Trondëk Hwëchin Final Agreement was signed on July 16, 1998, and came into effect on September 15, 1998.

The government is growing and evolving to support citizens in ensuring a strong and healthy future while maintaining connections to traditional knowledge and the land. Promoting the Hän language, learning traditional skills from the Elders, and investing in youth have all strengthened Trondëk Hwëchin development. This respect for their heritage and dedication to the future is reflected in a variety of ways. The biennial Moosehide Gatherings, the establishment of Dänojà Zho Cultural Centre, the designation of Trochëk National Historic site, and the return of the traditional songs, which were once entrusted to Alaskan First Nations people, all reflect Trondëk Hwëchin investment in their future and pride in their rich heritage.

In 2022, the mummified body of a young woolly mammoth was discovered during a mining operation on land belonging to the Trondëk Hwëchin.

Demographics 

References

External links
Trondëk Hwëchin First Nation web site
Government of Canada's Department of Indian and Northern Affairs First Nation profile "This page is not available on the web because of server error," 6 Sep. 2022.
Chief Isaac's People web site

Hän 
First Nations in Yukon
First Nations governments in Yukon
Dawson City